Taras Bulba is a 1924 German silent adventure film directed by Vladimir Strizhevsky and Joseph N. Ermolieff and starring J.N. Douvan-Tarzow, Oscar Marion and Clementine Plessner. It is based on the short story Taras Bulba by Nikolai Gogol, and made at the Emelka Studios in Munich. It was one of several Russian-themed films that exiled producer Ermolieff made in Munich during the 1920s.

The film's art direction was by Kurt Dürnhöfer and Willy Reiber.

Cast
 J.N. Douvan-Tarzow as Taras Bulba
 Oscar Marion as Andry, Son of Taras
 Clementine Plessner as Bulba's Wife
 Helena Makowska as Panotschka
 N.N. Novitzky as Woiwode
 Alexander Polonsky as Jankel, Innkeeper
 Josef Rounitch as Ostap, Son of Taras
 Lia Tschung Tsching as Servant
 August Junker
 Rudolf Raab

References

Bibliography
 Rollberg, Peter. Historical Dictionary of Russian and Soviet Cinema. Scarecrow Press, 2008.

External links 
 

1924 films
Films of the Weimar Republic
German historical adventure films
German silent feature films
1920s historical adventure films
Films set in Ukraine
Films based on Taras Bulba
Films set in the 16th century
German black-and-white films
Silent historical adventure films
1920s German films
1920s German-language films